Progressivism holds that it is possible to improve human societies through political action. As a political movement, progressivism seeks to advance the human condition through social reform based on purported advancements in science, technology, economic development, and social organization. Adherents hold that progressivism has universal application and endeavor to spread this idea to human societies everywhere. Progressivism arose during the Age of Enlightenment out of the belief that civility in Europe was improving due to the application of new empirical knowledge to the governance of society.

In modern political discourse, progressivism gets often associated with social liberalism, a left-leaning type of liberalism, in contrast to the right-leaning neoliberalism, combining support for a mixed economy with cultural liberalism. In the 21st century, a movement that identifies as progressive is "a social or political movement that aims to represent the interests of ordinary people through political change and the support of government actions."

History

From the Enlightenment to the Industrial Revolution 

Immanuel Kant identified progress as being a movement away from barbarism toward civilization. 18th-century philosopher and political scientist Marquis de Condorcet predicted that political progress would involve the disappearance of slavery, the rise of literacy, the lessening of sex inequality, prison reforms which at the time were harsh and the decline of poverty.

Modernity or modernization was a key form of the idea of progress as promoted by classical liberals in the 19th and 20th centuries, who called for the rapid modernization of the economy and society to remove the traditional hindrances to free markets and the free movements of people.

In the late 19th century, a political view rose in popularity in the Western world that progress was being stifled by vast economic inequality between the rich and the poor, minimally regulated laissez-faire capitalism with out-of-control monopolistic corporations, intense and often violent conflict between capitalists and workers, with a need for measures to address these problems. Progressivism has influenced various political movements. Social liberalism was influenced by British liberal philosopher John Stuart Mill's conception of people being "progressive beings." British Prime Minister Benjamin Disraeli developed progressive conservatism under one-nation Toryism.

In France, the space between social revolution and the socially-conservative laissez-faire centre-right was filled with the emergence of radicalism which thought that social progress required anti-clericalism, humanism, and republicanism. Especially anti-clericalism was the dominant influence on the center-left in many French- and Romance-speaking countries until the mid-20th century. In Imperial Germany, Chancellor Otto von Bismarck enacted various progressive social welfare measures out of paternalistic conservative motivations to distance workers from the socialist movement of the time and as humane ways to assist in maintaining the Industrial Revolution.

In 1891, the Roman Catholic Church encyclical Rerum novarum issued by Pope Leo XIII condemned the exploitation of labor and urged support for labor unions and government regulation of businesses in the interests of social justice while upholding the property right and criticizing socialism. A  progressive Protestant outlook called the Social Gospel emerged in North America that focused on challenging economic exploitation and poverty and, by the mid-1890s, was common in many Protestant theological seminaries in the United States.

Early 20th-century progressivism included support for American engagement in World War I and the creation of and participation in the League of Nations, compulsory sterilization in Scandinavia, and eugenics in Great Britain, and the temperance movement. Progressives believed that progress was stifled by economic inequality, inadequately regulated monopolistic corporations, and conflict between workers and elites, arguing that corrective measures were needed.

Contemporary mainstream political conception of the philosophy

In the United States, progressivism began as an intellectual rebellion against the political philosophy of Constitutionalism as expressed by  John Locke and the founders of the American Republic, whereby the authority of government depends on observing limitations on its just powers. What began as a social movement in the 1890s grew into a popular political movement referred to as the Progressive era; in the 1912 United States presidential election, all three U.S. presidential candidates claimed to be progressives. While the term progressivism represents a range of diverse political pressure groups, not always united, progressives rejected social Darwinism, believing that the problems society faced, such as class warfare, greed, poverty, racism and violence, could best be addressed by providing good education, a safe environment, and an efficient workplace. Progressives lived mainly in the cities, were college educated, and believed in a strong central government. President Theodore Roosevelt of the Republican Party and later the Progressive Party declared that he "always believed that wise progressivism and wise conservatism go hand in hand."

President Woodrow Wilson was also a member of the American progressive movement within the Democratic Party. Progressive stances have evolved. Imperialism was a controversial issue within progressivism in the late 19th and early 20th centuries, particularly in the United States, where some progressives supported American imperialism while others opposed it. In response to World War I, President Woodrow Wilson's Fourteen Points established the concept of national self-determination and criticized imperialist competition and colonial injustices. Anti-imperialists supported these views in areas resisting imperial rule.

During the period of acceptance of economic Keynesianism (the 1930s–1970s), there was widespread acceptance in many nations of a large role for state intervention in the economy. With the rise of neoliberalism and challenges to state interventionist policies in the 1970s and 1980s, center-left progressive movements responded by adopting the Third Way, which emphasized a major role for the market economy. There have been social democrats who have called for the social-democratic movement to move past Third Way. Prominent progressive conservative elements in the British Conservative Party have criticized neoliberalism.

In the 21st century, progressives continue to favor public policy that they theorize will reduce or lessen the harmful effects of economic inequality as well as systemic discrimination such as institutional racism; to advocate for environmentally conscious policies as well as for social safety nets and workers' rights; and to oppose the negative externalities inflicted on the environment and society by monopolies or corporate influence on the democratic process. The unifying theme is to call attention to the negative impacts of current institutions or ways of doing things and to advocate for social progress, i.e., for positive change as defined by any of several standards such as the expansion of democracy, increased egalitarianism in the form of economic and social equality as well as improved well being of a population. Proponents of social democracy have identified themselves as promoting the progressive cause.

Types

Cultural progressivism 
Progressivism, in the general sense, mainly means social and cultural progressivism. There is cultural liberalism in a similar term, which is used substantially similarly. However, cultural liberals and progressives may differ in positions on cultural issues such as  cancel culture, and political correctness.

Unlike progressives in a broader sense, some cultural progressives may be economically centrist, conservative, or politically libertarian. The Czech Pirate Party is classified as a (cultural or social) progressive party, but it calls itself "economically centrist and socially liberal".

Economic progressivism 

Economic progressivism is a term used to distinguish it from progressivism in cultural fields. Economic progressives' views are often rooted in the concept of social justice and aim to improve the human condition through government regulation, social protections and the maintenance of public goods.

Some economic progressives may show center-right views on cultural issues. These movements are related to communitarian conservative movements such as Christian democracy and one-nation conservatism.

Techno progressivism

Progressive parties or parties with progressive factions

Current parties 

 : Frente de Todos (factions)
 : Australian Greens, Reason Party,  Australian Labor Party (factions)
 : Workers' Party, Brazilian Socialist Party (factions), Democratic Labour Party, Socialism and Liberty Party
 : Liberal Party of Canada (factions), New Democratic Party
 : Social Convergence, Liberal Party of Chile
 : Humane Colombia
 : Czech Pirate Party
 : Radical Party of the Left, New Deal
 : Alliance 90/The Greens
 : Syriza
 : Democratic Coalition
 : Bahujan Samaj Party, Trinamool Congress
 : Possible, Green Europe
 : Indonesian Solidarity Party
 : Social Democratic Party, Japanese Communist Party, Reiwa Shinsengumi
 : Vetëvendosje
 : Democrats 66
 : Pakistan Peoples Party
 : Akbayan
 : Polish Initiative, Your Movement
 : Socialist Party, Left Bloc, People Animals Nature,
 : Save Romania Union, Democracy and Solidarity Party, Volt Romania, PRO Romania
 : Yabloko
 : Party of the Radical Left
 : Justice Party, Progressive Party, Mirae Party
 : Unidas Podemos, Spanish Socialist Worker's Party, Más Madrid
 : Democratic Progressive Party, New Power Party
 : Move Forward Party, Thai Liberal Party
 : Peoples' Democratic Party
 : Green Party of England and Wales, Labour Party (factions), Scottish National Party, Plaid Cymru, Social Democratic and Labour Party
 : Democratic Party (factions), Green Party of the United States
 : Popular Will

Former parties 

 : Front for Victory
 : Progressive Party of Canada
 : Movement Party, Opportunist Republicans
 : Demosisto
 : Japan Socialist Party
 : Free-thinking Democratic League
 : Jim Anderton's Progressive Party
 : Spring
 : Romanian Social Party, National Union for the Progress of Romania
 : Progressive Party (1956), Democratic Labor Party, New Progressive Party, Unified Progressive Party
 : Progressive Party (1912), Progressive Party (1924), Progressive Party (1948)

See also 

 Australian Progressives
 Affirmative action
 Democracy
 Democratic socialism
 Economic progressivism
 Egalitarianism
 Green politics
 Kirchnerism
 Left-libertarianism
 Left-wing nationalism
 Left-wing politics
 Left-wing populism
 Liberal socialism
 Liberalism
 Lulism
 Managerial state
 Modern liberalism in the United States
 Progressive conservatism
 Progressive Era
 Progressive Party
 Progressive tax
 Progressivism in South Korea
 Progressivism in the United States
 Radicalism (historical)
 Reformist party (Japan)
 Revisionism (Marxism)
 Secularism
 Social Justice
 Secular liberalism
 Social democracy
 Socialism
 Transhumanism
 Transhumanist politics
 Techno-progressivism

References

Citations

Sources 

 Tindall, George and Shi, David E. America: A Narrative History. W W Norton & Co Inc; Full Sixth edition, 2003. .
 Lakoff, George. Don't Think of an Elephant: Know Your Values and Frame the Debate. Chelsea Green Publishing, 2004. .
 Kelleher, William J. Progressive Logic: Framing A Unified Field Theory of Values For Progressives. The Empathic Science Institute, 2005. .
 Kloppenberg, James T. Uncertain Victory: Social Democracy and Progressivism in European and American Thought, 1870–1920. Oxford University Press, US, 1988. .
 Link, Arthur S. and McCormick, Richard L. Progressivism (American History Series). Harlan Davidson, 1983. .
 McGerr, Michael. A Fierce Discontent: The Rise and Fall of the Progressive Movement in America, 1870–1920. 2003. 
 Schutz, Aaron. Social Class, Social Action, and Education: The Failure of Progressive Democracy. Palgrave, Macmillan, 2010. .
 Tröhler, Daniel. Progressivism. In: Oxford Research Encyclopedia of Education. Oxford University Press, 2017.

External links 
 Progressivism – entry at the Encyclopædia Britannica
 
 

 
Centrism
Centre-left ideologies
Critical thinking
Democratic socialism
Green politics
Justice
Left-wing ideologies
Liberal socialism
Liberalism
Political ideologies
Political movements
Secularism
Secular humanism
Social change
Social democracy
Social justice
Social liberalism
Social movements
Sociocultural evolution theory